"We're Not Gonna Take It" is the final track on the Who's rock opera Tommy. Written by Pete Townshend, the song also contains the "See Me, Feel Me" anthem that is central to the structure of Tommy.

Background
According to Pete Townshend, "We're Not Gonna Take It" was not originally written for the Tommy storyline. He instead says that it was inspired by the people's reaction to politics.

In the storyline of Tommy, this song describes Tommy's followers' rejection of Tommy's new religion that bans drinking and drugs and centers around pinball. The song reprises the "See Me, Feel Me" and "Listening to You" themes that were seen previously throughout the album.

Release

In addition to being released on the Tommy album, "We're Not Gonna Take It" was released as a single in different forms. In America, it was the B-Side to "I'm Free", another album track. However, in 1970, the "See Me, Feel Me" portion was released as a single, backed with "Overture from Tommy". This version has been included on numerous compilation albums.

Personnel
Roger Daltrey – lead vocals in the verse
Pete Townshend – backing vocals, electric guitar, keyboards
John Entwistle – lead vocals in the chorus, backing vocals, bass guitar
Keith Moon – drums

References

1969 songs
The Who songs
Songs written by Pete Townshend
Song recordings produced by Kit Lambert
Redirects from songs
1969 singles